2400 Fulton Street is a compilation album of music from the San Francisco rock band Jefferson Airplane, originally released in 1987 as a double LP containing 25 tracks.  The title is taken from the street address of a mansion the band bought in 1966 and used as a residence. It is located across the street from Golden Gate Park.

The expanded CD release is titled "2400 Fulton Street --- The CD Collection", and contains 11 extra tracks including one that comprises their otherwise unavailable Levis radio commercials of 1967.  At the time, Levi Strauss marketed a line of jeans that were bleached white by exposure to sea water.  Termed White Levis, they nevertheless came in several colors and were popular among surfers along the west coast. Levi Strauss had sought out three contemporary acts to help market the new product ; Jefferson Airplane, The Sopwith Camel and the West Coast Natural Gas Co were selected and performed unstructured radio pieces which were then used in the commercials .  The short radio spots aired nationally in the United States.

Track listing

Disc One

Disc Two

Reception

Allmusic's Bruce Eder rated the compilation four out of five stars. He explained that it "[jumps] around a little too much, but provides a look for the uninitiated into the evolution of the group's sound". He concluded by stating that "the sound was a major improvement at the time" and that "the notes contained what was, at the time, perhaps the best easily available account of the group's history."

References

1987 greatest hits albums
Jefferson Airplane compilation albums
RCA Records compilation albums